Wang Xuanhong (born July 24, 1989 in Dalian) is a Chinese footballer, as a left-footed midfielder for Dalian Duxing.

Club career
Wang Xuanhong was loaned out to Citizen along with Yan Shipeng at the beginning of the 2007/08 Hong Kong First Division League season. His loan period at Citizen was to prove extremely productive when he scored ten league goals for them before he returned to Dalian Shide. His personal highlight came when he scored four goals against Hong Kong Rangers FC on the 16th of September 2007 in only his second competitive game for Citizen. After his personally successful loan at Citizen he would immediately return to China to begin his career with Dalian when he made his debut against Chengdu Blades on April 12, 2008 in a 2-1 defeat. Often coming on a substitute throughout much of his Dalian career it wasn't until the 2009 Chinese Super League season when Wang started to become regular within the team when he would score his first goal for the club on September 12, 2009 against Changsha Ginde in a 1-1 draw.

In January 2017, Wang transferred to China League One side Beijing Renhe.

Career statistics
Statistics accurate as of match played 31 December 2020.

Honours

Club
Qingdao Hainiu
 China League Two: 2013

International
China U-17 national team
 AFC U-17 Championship: 2004

References

External links
 
Wang Xuanhong at HKFA
Profile at www.7m.cn
Profile at sodasoccer.com 
Profile at Citizenfc.com 
Profile at Dalian Shide website 

1989 births
Living people
Association football midfielders
Association football forwards
Chinese footballers
Footballers from Dalian
Expatriate footballers in Hong Kong
Hong Kong First Division League players
Citizen AA players
Dalian Shide F.C. players
Chongqing Liangjiang Athletic F.C. players
Dalian Professional F.C. players
Qingdao F.C. players
Beijing Renhe F.C. players
Guizhou F.C. players
Chinese Super League players
China League One players
China League Two players
Footballers at the 2010 Asian Games
Asian Games competitors for China
Hong Kong League XI representative players